Albert Venn Dicey,  (4 February 1835 – 7 April 1922), usually cited as A. V. Dicey, was a British Whig jurist and constitutional theorist. He is most widely known as the author of Introduction to the Study of the Law of the Constitution (1885). The principles it expounds are considered part of the uncodified British constitution. He became Vinerian Professor of English Law at Oxford, one of the first Professors of Law at the London School of Economics, and a leading constitutional scholar of his day. Dicey popularised the phrase "rule of law", although its use goes back to the 17th century.

Biography
Dicey was born on 4 February 1835. His father was Thomas Edward Dicey, senior wrangler in 1811 and proprietor of the Northampton Mercury and Chairman of the Midland Railway. His mother was Annie Marie Stephen, daughter of  James Stephen, Master in Chancery. He owed everything  - the expression is his own - to the wisdom and firmness of his mother.  His elder brother was Edward James Stephen Dicey. He was also a cousin of Leslie Stephen and Sir James Fitzjames Stephen.

Dicey was educated at King's College School in London and Balliol College, Oxford, graduating with Firsts in classical moderations in 1856 and in literae humaniores in 1858. In 1860 he won a fellowship at Trinity College, Oxford, which he forfeited upon his marriage in 1872.

He was called to the bar by the Inner Temple in 1863, subscribed to the Jamaica Committee around 1865, and was appointed to the Vinerian Chair of English Law at Oxford in 1882, a post he held until 1909. In his first major work, the seminal Introduction to the Study of the Law of the Constitution, he outlined the principles of parliamentary sovereignty for which he is most known. He argued that the British Parliament was "an absolutely sovereign legislature" with the "right to make or unmake any law". In the book, he defined the term constitutional law as including "all rules which directly or indirectly affect the distribution or the exercise of the sovereign power in the state". He understood that the freedom British subjects enjoyed was dependent on the sovereignty of Parliament, the impartiality of the courts free from governmental interference and the supremacy of the common law. In 1890, he was appointed Queen's Counsel.

He later left Oxford and went on to become one of the first Professors of Law at the then-new London School of Economics. There he published in 1896 his Conflict of Laws. Upon his death on 7 April 1922, Harold Laski memorialised him as "the most considerable figure in English jurisprudence since Maitland."

Political views

Dicey was receptive to Jeremy Bentham's brand of individualist liberalism and welcomed the extension of the franchise in 1867. He was affiliated with the group known as the "University Liberals," who composed the Essays on Reform and was not ashamed to be labeled a Radical. Dicey held that "personal liberty is the basis of national welfare." He treated Parliamentary sovereignty as the central premise of the British constitution.

Dicey became a Liberal Unionist and a vigorous opponent of Home Rule for Ireland and published and spoke against it extensively from 1886 until shortly before his death, advocating that no concessions be made to Irish nationalism in relation to the government of any part of Ireland as an integral part of the United Kingdom. In March 1914 Dicey stated that if a Home Rule Bill was passed it "would be a political crime lacking all moral and constitutional authority...the voice of the present House of Commons was not the voice of the nation."   He was thus bitterly disillusioned by the Anglo-Irish Treaty agreement in 1921 that Southern Ireland should become a self-governing dominion (the Irish Free State), separate from the United Kingdom.

Dicey was also vehemently opposed to women's suffrage, proportional representation (while acknowledging that the existing first-past-the-post system wasn't perfect), and to the notion that citizens have the right to ignore unjust laws. Dicey viewed the necessity of establishing a stable legal system as more important than the potential injustice that would occur from following unjust laws. In spite of this, he did concede that there were circumstances in which it would be appropriate to resort to an armed rebellion but stated that such occasions are extremely rare.

Bibliography
 Introduction to the Study of the Law of the Constitution (8th Edition with new Introduction) (1915)
 A Leap in the Dark, or Our New Constitution (an examination of the leading principles of the Home Rule Bill of 1893) (1893)
 A Treatise on the Rules for the Selection of the Parties to an Action (1870)
 England's Case against Home Rule (1887)
 The Privy Council: The Arnold Prize Essay (1887)
 Letters on unionist delusions (1887)
 A digest of the law of England with reference to the conflict of laws (1st ed. 1896, 2nd ed. 1908);
 later expanded in various editions of Dicey Morris & Collins
 
 A Fool's Paradise: Being a Constitutionalist's Criticism of the Home Rule Bill of 1912 (1913)
 
 
 
 
  Vol. 1 includes the first edition of Introduction, with the main addenda in later editions; vol. 2, The Comparative Study of Constitutions, provides largely unpublished lectures on comparative constitutional law, intended for a further book; both volumes have extensive editorial commentary.

Biographies

References

External links
 
 
 
 
 
 Grave of Albert Venn Dicey and his wife Eleanor in St Sepulchre's Cemetery, Oxford, with biography
 Great Thinkers: Vernon Bogdanor FBA on A.V. Dicey FBA podcast, The British Academy
 

1835 births
1922 deaths
Academics of the London School of Economics
Alumni of Balliol College, Oxford
Scholars of constitutional law
English constitutionalists
English legal scholars
English legal writers
Conflict of laws scholars
People educated at King's College School, London
Vinerian Professors of English Law
English King's Counsel
Members of the Inner Temple
Fellows of Trinity College, Oxford
Fellows of the British Academy
Presidents of the Oxford Union
People from Lutterworth
Burials at St Sepulchre's Cemetery